is a Japanese voice actress and singer from Akashi, Hyōgo. She is currently affiliated with Aoni Production. She is best known for her role as Shiori Fujisaki in the Tokimeki Memorial series. Other notable roles include Izumi Himuro in Princess Nine, Nagisa Shiozaki in If I See You In My Dreams, Miss Merry Christmas & Stussy in One Piece, Rei Kazama in eX-Driver, Maki Kawasaki in Burn Up Excess, Li Xiangfei in Fatal Fury / The King of Fighters; and Da Ji in Warriors Orochi.

Filmography

Anime

Film

Video games

Dubbing

Audio

Discography
Albums
  (Konami, 1996)
 Catchy (Konami, 1996)
  (Konami, 1997)
 K-Brand (Konami, 1998)
 Touch and Go (Konami, 1998)
 From the Bests (Konami, 1999)
  (King, 2000)
 Vintage (King, 2001)
 Love Clue (King, 2001)
 Watashi no Tsubasa (Toei, 2002)
 Rainbow (Most, 2015)

 Compilation albums
  (Konami, 2004)

References

External links
  
 Mami Kingetsu at Oricon 
 

1965 births
Living people
Voice actresses from Hyōgo Prefecture
Japanese child actresses
Japanese voice actresses
Japanese video game actresses
Japanese women pop singers
Musicians from Hyōgo Prefecture
20th-century Japanese actresses
20th-century Japanese women singers
20th-century Japanese singers
21st-century Japanese actresses
21st-century Japanese women singers
21st-century Japanese singers
Aoni Production voice actors
People from Akashi, Hyōgo